Olive Furnace, also known as Mount Olive Furnace, is a historic iron furnace site on State Route 93 at Township Road 239 (Olive Branch Rd.), north of Pedro, Ohio in Washington Township, Lawrence County, Ohio. It was added to the National Register of Historic Places on April 12, 2007.

See also
National Register of Historic Places listings in Lawrence County, Ohio

References

National Register of Historic Places in Lawrence County, Ohio
Blast furnaces in the United States